Tuckia africana is a species of moth of the family Tortricidae. It is found in South Africa (KwaZulu-Natal, Gauteng) and Zimbabwe.

References

Moths described in 1881
Archipini